Marcus C. Evans Jr. is an American politician currently serving as Illinois state representative for the 33rd district. The 33rd district includes all or parts of the Burnside and Chatham neighborhoods of Chicago along with the suburbs of Burnham, Calumet City, Lansing, Lynwood and Sauk Village.

Early life and career
Evans earned a Bachelor of Arts in mathematics from Chicago State University. He served as deputy chief of staff to Alderman Michelle Harris. Evans is also a cancer survivor.

Illinois House of Representatives
Marlow H. Colvin resigned from the Illinois House of Representatives effective April 12, 2012. Local Democratic leaders appointed Evans to the vacancy. Evans took office April 13, 2012. On December 5, 2012, Evans was appointed to the Illinois Sentencing Policy Advisory Council which oversees the Adult Redeploy Illinois program which works with local jurisdictions to increase community-based alternatives to incarceration for non-violent offenders. On March 16, 2015, Evans was appointed to the State Housing Task Force which works to ensure that the Annual Comprehensive Housing Plan as adopted coordinates all housing policies within state agencies. Evans is also one of four legislators to serve as an Illinois High School Association Liaison Representative.

He is a member of the Illinois House Legislative Black Caucus.

On February 23, 2021, Evans sponsored a bill that would ban the sale of games like Grand Theft Auto V. Earlier in the year, Evans introduced the bill following a series of carjackings at gas stations and convenience stores Though the bill did not mention Grand Theft Auto by name, it was interpreted online to be a ban on that game. The bill was covered in a number of gaming-related magazines including PC Gamer.

As of July 3, 2022, Representative Evans is a member of the following Illinois House committees:

 Appropriations - Human Services (HAPH)
 (Chairman) Business & Innovation Subcommittee (HLBR-BUIN)
 Ethics & Elections Committee (SHEE)
 Executive Committee (HEXC)
 Health Care Availability & Access Committee (HHCA)
 (Chairman of) Income Tax Subcommittee (HREF-INTX)
 (Chairman of) Labor & Commerce Committee (HLBR)
 Medicaid & Managed Care Subcommittee (HAPH-MEDI)
 (Chairman of) Minority Impact Analysis Subcommittee (HLBR-MIAS)
 Revenue & Finance Committee (HREF)
 (Chairman of) Wage Policy & Study Subcommittee (HLBR-WAGE)
 Workforce Development Subcommittee (HLBR-WORK)

Electoral history

References

External links
Representative Marcus C. Evans Jr. (D) at the Illinois General Assembly
By session: 98th, 97th
State Representative Marcus C. Evans Jr. constituency site
 
Rep. Marcus Evans at Illinois House Democrats

Living people
Democratic Party members of the Illinois House of Representatives
Year of birth missing (living people)
African-American state legislators in Illinois
Politicians from Chicago
Chicago State University alumni
21st-century American politicians
Video game censorship
21st-century African-American politicians